Georgios Perrakis (born 12 July 1946 in Pireaus) is a sailor from Greece, who represented his country at the 1976 Summer Olympics in Kingston, Ontario, Canada as crew member in the Soling. With helmsman George Andreadis and fellow crew member Konstantinos Lymberakis they took the 14th place.

Sources
 

Living people
1946 births
Greek male sailors (sport)
Sailors at the 1976 Summer Olympics – Soling
Olympic sailors of Greece
Sailors (sport) from Piraeus